Guy Bennett is a writer and translator. He lives in Los Angeles.

Biography
Guy Bennett was born in Los Angeles. After studies in art, music, languages and literature, he graduated with a PhD in French literature from UCLA in 1993. Bennett has worked as a musician, teacher, translator, typographer and book designer. He joined the faculty of Otis College of Art and Design in 1999.

Work

Poetry

Early books (1998–2011)
Bennett’s early collections of poetry were written from source texts via the use of constraints. “His writing,” Douglas Messerli has noted, “often has formal systems quietly embedded in it, but the poetry itself is influenced by a wide range of interests: music […], photography, film, architecture, and, as one might expect, the languages and literatures of other countries.” In The Row for example, Bennett adapts the fundamentals of the twelve-tone technique to verse, drawing its verbal content from writings on music by and about Anton Webern, a pioneer of twelve-tone composition. In “The Lilac Variations,” written in memoriam Jackson Mac Low, he applies the latter’s diastic method to Walt Whitman’s elegy on the death of Lincoln, “When Lilacs Last in the Dooryard Bloom’d.”

Later books (2015–present)
His more recent collections have evolved away from “external” subject matter to address more writerly and literary concerns. In the essay “Guy Bennett : l’écriture marginale” [ “Guy Bennett: Marginal Writing” ], Jean-Philippe Cazier has claimed that Bennett’s project consists of “écrire des livres qui sont en acte une critique du livre, de la représentation et de la production du livre, critique impliquant nécessairement la création d’un nouveau type de livre centré sur la marge” [ “writing books which are, as acts, critiques of the book, of the representation and production of the book, a critique that necessarily implies the creation of a new type of book centered on margins.” ] He explains:

Bennett himself has qualified these later works as explorations in paratext, “transformant des scories littéraires […] en des formes scriptibles et des genres littéraires à part entière, désormais capables de se suffire à eux-mêmes […].” [ “transforming literary dross […] into fully-fledged writerly forms and literary genres now able to stand on their own […].” ]

Translation
In his work as a translator, Bennett has focused primarily on experimental writing by contemporary French and francophone authors, among them Nicole Brossard, Mohammed Dib, Jean-Michel Espitallier, Mostafa Nissabouri, Valère Novarina, and Jacques Roubaud. He has also extensively translated the Italian visual poet Giovanna Sandri, editing a volume of her selected poems in 2016. “I remain fascinated by visual poetries and other more marginal types of writings,” he remarked in an interview with Teresa Villa-Ignacio. “[I] am intrigued by the problems they pose to translation and what one can make of […] experimental writings that may not mean in traditional ways.”

Honors
Named Chevalier de l'Ordre des palmes académiques by the French Ministry of National Education in April 2005.

Selected publications

Poetry
Poetry from Instructions. Los Angeles: Sophical Things, 2023.
Remerciements. (Co-translated with Frank Smith) Bordeaux: Éditions de l'Attente, 2021.
Wiersze zrozumiałe same przez się. (Translation of Self-Evident Poems by Aleksandra Małecka) Kraków: Korporacja HA!ART, 2021.
Post-Self-Evident-Poems. Digital edition published by Jonas Pelzer, 2020.
Œuvres presque accomplies. (Co-translated with Frédéric Forte) Bordeaux: Éditions de l'Attente, 2018.
Ce livre. (Co-translated with Frédéric Forte) Bordeaux: Éditions de l'Attente, 2017.
Poèmes évidents. (Translation of Self-Evident Poems by the author and Frédéric Forte) Bordeaux: Éditions de l'Attente, 2015.
 View Source. London: vErIsImIlItUdE, 2015.
Self-Evident Poems. Los Angeles: Otis Books | Seismicity Editions, 2011.
32 Snapshots of Marseilles. Corvallis, OR: Sacrifice Press, 2010.
Drive to Cluster. In collaboration with painter Ron Griffin. Piacenza: ML & NLF, 2003.
The Row. Los Angeles: Seeing Eye Books, 2000.
Last Words. Los Angeles: Sun & Moon Press, 1998.

Translations
Hollander, Benjamin. Vigilance. Bordeaux: Éditions de l’Attente, 2022. [With Frank Smith and Françoise Valéry]
Nissabouri, Mostafa. For An Ineffable Metrics of the Desert. Los Angeles: Otis Books, 2018. [With Pierre Joris, Addie Leak, and Teresa Villa-Ignacio]
Sandri, Giovanna. only fragments found: selected poems, 1969–1996. Los Angeles: Otis Books, 2016. [With Faust Paoluzzi and the author]
Dib, Mohammed. Tlemcen or Places of Writing. Los Angeles: Otis Books / Seismicity Editions, 2012.
Spatola, Adriano. Toward Total Poetry. Los Angeles: Otis Books / Seismicity Editions, 2008. [with Brendan W. Hennessey]
Roubaud, Jacques. Poetry, etc. Cleaning House. Los Angeles: Green Integer, 2006.
Khaïr-Eddine, Mohammed. Damaged Fauna. Los Angeles, Seeing Eye Books, 2006.
Espitallier, Jean-Michel. Espitallier’s Theorem. Los Angeles: Seismicity Editions, 2005.
Novarina, Valère. Adramelech’s Monologue. Los Angeles: Seeing Eye Books, 2004.
Brossard, Nicole. Shadow / Soft et Soif. Los Angeles, Seeing Eye Books, 2003. Selections published in Drunken Boat 8 (2006).

Selected reviews
Nicolas, Alain, “Guy Bennett, merci pour tout et pour rien,” L’Humanité, July 14, 2021.
Cazier, Jean-Philippe, “Guy Bennett : l’écriture marginale (Remerciements),” Diacritik, July 9, 2021.
Rosset, Christian, “Petite constellation d’été : poésie,” Diacritik, July 6, 2021.
Dubost, Jean-Pascal, “(Note de lecture), Guy Bennett, Œuvres presque accomplies,” Poezibau, October 31, 2018.
Chevillard, Éric, “La fabrique du texte : La chronique d’Éric Chevillard, à propos de « Ce livre », de Guy Bennett,” Le Monde, March 9, 2017.
Claro, Christophe, “Le magicien glose : Bennett en son miroir,” Le clavier cannibale, February 7, 2017.
Nicolas, Alain, “L’irrésistible évidence des poèmes de Guy Bennett,” L’Humanité, March 2, 2016.
Chevillard, Éric, “Nul ptyx : Éric Chevillard chante, lyrique, l’évidence du poète américain Guy Bennett.” Le Monde, October 7, 2015.

Interviews
 "Poesia secondo istruzioni, a cura di Guy Bennett," Nazione Indiana, Andrea Inglese. (January 2023)
 "Guy Bennett se raconte – L'Enfance de la littérature," Permanences de la littérature, Marie-Laure Picot, directrice. (April 2019)
 "Interview with Guy Bennett," Teresa Villa-Ignacio interviews Guy Bennett on translation and its relation to his writing, especially of poetry. (October 2013)
 "LA-Lit Interviews Guy Bennett," by Stephanie Rioux and Mathew Timmons. (February 2006)
 "Entrevue avec le poète américain Guy Bennett réalisée par Hassan El Ouazzani." art Le Sabord 70 (2005): 44–51.
 "Paris / Morocco / L.A.: Poet, translator, and publisher Guy Bennett talks (with Leonard Schwartz) about his poetry, his publishing venture Seeing Eye Books, and his translations of Valère Novarina and Mostafa Nissabouri."
 "Difficult Fruits and Paraphrase: Guy Bennett talks to Andrew Maxwell about translation and constraint." Double Change II (2002).

References

External links
 
 
 

1960 births
Living people
American male poets
Writers from Los Angeles
Otis College of Art and Design faculty
Chevaliers of the Ordre des Palmes Académiques
21st-century American poets
21st-century American translators
21st-century American male writers